William Henry Suttor (4 November 1834 – 20 October 1905) was an Australian politician and pastoralist.

He was born at Brucedale near Bathurst to William Henry Suttor and Charlotte Augusta Ann Francis. He was educated at Parramatta and then worked on the family property, becoming his father's partner by 1865. In 1862 he married Adelaide Agnes Henrietta Bowler, with whom he had seven children.

His father had been a member of the New South Wales Legislative Council and the Legislative Assembly, and in 1875 William Junior followed him into parliament, being elected to the Legislative Assembly for East Macquarie, a seat previously held by both his father, and his uncle John. He served until his resignation in 1879, including a period as Secretary for Mines from 1877 to 1878. In 1880 he was appointed to the Legislative Council, where he remained until 1900, serving twice (1889–1891, 1894–1895) as Vice-President of the Executive Council and Representative of the Government in the Legislative Council.

References

 

1834 births
1905 deaths
Members of the New South Wales Legislative Assembly
Members of the New South Wales Legislative Council
19th-century Australian politicians